Tinocallis platani is a species of aphids in the subfamily Calaphidinae. It has a nearctic distribution and is found in Europe and North America.

References

External links 
 
 Tinocallis platani at insectoid.info

Insects described in 1843
Panaphidini